Events from the year 1963 in the United States.

Incumbents

Federal Government 
 President: John F. Kennedy (D-Massachusetts) (until November 22), Lyndon B. Johnson (D-Texas) (starting November 22)
 Vice President: Lyndon B. Johnson (D-Texas) (until November 22), vacant (starting November 22)
 Chief Justice: Earl Warren (California)
 Speaker of the House of Representatives: John William McCormack (D-Massachusetts)
 Senate Majority Leader: Mike Mansfield (D-Montana)
 Congress: 87th (until January 3), 88th (starting January 3)

Events

January
 January 8 – Leonardo da Vinci's Mona Lisa is exhibited in the United States for the only time, being unveiled at the National Gallery of Art in Washington, D.C. 
 January 14 – George Wallace becomes governor of Alabama. In his inaugural speech, he defiantly proclaims "segregation now, segregation tomorrow, and segregation forever!"
 January 28 – African American student Harvey Gantt enters Clemson University in South Carolina, the last U.S. state to hold out against racial integration.

February
 February 8 – Travel, financial and commercial transactions by United States citizens to Cuba are made illegal by the John F. Kennedy Administration.
 February 11 – The CIA's Domestic Operations Division is created.
 February 12 – Northwest Orient Airlines Flight 705 crashes in the Florida Everglades, killing everyone aboard.
 February 19 – The publication of Betty Friedan's The Feminine Mystique launches the reawakening of the Women's Movement in the United States as women's organizations and consciousness-raising groups spread.
 February 28 – Dorothy Schiff resigns from the New York Newspaper Publisher's Association, feeling that the city needs at least one paper. Her paper, the New York Post, resumes publication on March 4.

March
 March – Iron Man debuts in Marvel Comics's Tales of Suspense #39, cover-dated this month.
 March 5 – In Camden, Tennessee, country music star Patsy Cline (Virginia Patterson Hensley) is killed in a plane crash along with fellow performers Hawkshaw Hawkins, Cowboy Copas, and Cline's manager and pilot Randy Hughes, while returning from a benefit performance in Kansas City, Kansas for country radio disc jockey "Cactus" Jack Call.
 March 18 – Gideon v. Wainwright: The Supreme Court rules that state courts are required to provide counsel in criminal cases for defendants who cannot afford to pay their own attorneys.
 March 21 – The Alcatraz Federal Penitentiary on Alcatraz Island in San Francisco Bay closes; the last 27 prisoners are transferred elsewhere at the order of Attorney General Robert F. Kennedy.
 March 31 – The 1962–63 New York City newspaper strike ends after 114 days.

April
 April 1 – The long-running soap opera General Hospital debuts on ABC Television in the United States.
 April 3 – Southern Christian Leadership Conference volunteers kick off the Birmingham campaign against racial segregation with a sit-in.
 April 8 – The 35th Academy Awards ceremony, hosted by Frank Sinatra, is held at Santa Monica Civic Auditorium. David Lean's Lawrence of Arabia wins and receives the most respective awards and nominations with seven and ten, winning Best Picture and Lean's second Best Director win.
 April 12 – Martin Luther King Jr., Ralph Abernathy, Fred Shuttlesworth and others are arrested in a Birmingham protest for "parading without a permit".
 April 16 – Martin Luther King Jr. issues his Letter from Birmingham Jail.
 April 20 – Martin Luther King Jr. posts bail and begins to plan more demonstrations (the Children's Crusade).

May
 May 1 – The Coca-Cola Company debuts its first diet drink, TaB cola.
 May 2 – Thousands of African Americans, many of them children, are arrested while protesting segregation in Birmingham, Alabama. Public Safety Commissioner Eugene "Bull" Connor later unleashes fire hoses and police dogs on the demonstrators.
 May 8 – Dr. No, the first James Bond film, is shown in U.S. theaters.
 May 15 – Mercury program: NASA launches Gordon Cooper on Mercury 9, the last mission (on June 12 NASA Administrator James E. Webb tells Congress the program is complete).
 May 27 – The Freewheelin' Bob Dylan, singer-songwriter Bob Dylan's second studio album, and most influential, is released by Columbia Records.

June
 June 3 – Huế chemical attacks: Members of the Army of the Republic of Vietnam pour chemicals on the heads of Buddhist protesters. The U.S. threatens to cut off aid to Ngo Dinh Diem's regime.
 June 4 – President John F. Kennedy signs Executive Order 11110.
 June 10
 President John F. Kennedy delivers "A Strategy of Peace" speech at the American University in Washington, D.C., outlining a road map for the complete disarmament of nuclear weapons and world peace.
The University of Central Florida is established by the Florida legislature.
 June 11 
Alabama Governor George Wallace stands in the door of the University of Alabama to protest against integration, before stepping aside and allowing African Americans James Hood and Vivian Malone to enroll.
President John F. Kennedy delivers a historic Civil Rights Address, in which he promises a Civil Rights Bill, and asks for "the kind of equality of treatment that we would want for ourselves."
 June 12 
 Medgar Evers is assassinated in Jackson, Mississippi. His killer, Byron De La Beckwith, is convicted in 1994.
 The film Cleopatra, starring Elizabeth Taylor, Rex Harrison and Richard Burton, is released in the United States.
 June 13 – The cancellation of Mercury 10 effectively ends the Mercury program of U.S. manned spaceflight.
 June 17 – Abington School District v. Schempp: The U.S. Supreme Court rules that state-mandated Bible reading in public schools is unconstitutional.
 June 23
 Walt Disney's Enchanted Tiki Room opens at Disneyland, premiering the first Audio-Animatronics in the park.
 Detroit Walk to Freedom occurs in Detroit drawing a crowd of roughly 125,000 people.
 June 26 – In a speech in West Berlin, President John F. Kennedy famously declares "Ich bin ein Berliner".

July
 July 1 – ZIP codes are introduced in the U.S.
 July 7 – Double Seven Day scuffle: Secret police loyal to Ngô Đình Nhu, brother of President Ngô Đình Diệm, attack American journalists including Peter Arnett and David Halberstam at a demonstration during the Buddhist crisis.
 July 26 – NASA launches Syncom, the world's first geostationary (synchronous) satellite.

August

 August 5 – The United States, United Kingdom, and Soviet Union sign a nuclear test ban treaty.
 August 18 – James Meredith becomes the first black person to graduate from the University of Mississippi.
 August 21 – Cable 243: In the wake of the Xá Lợi Pagoda raids, the Kennedy administration orders the US Embassy, Saigon to explore alternative leadership in South Vietnam, opening the way towards a coup against Diem.
 August 28 – Martin Luther King Jr. delivers his "I Have a Dream" speech on the steps of the Lincoln Memorial to an audience of at least 250,000, during the March on Washington for Jobs and Freedom.

September
 September 7 – The Pro Football Hall of Fame opens in Canton, Ohio, with 17 charter members.
September 15 – The 16th Street Baptist Church bombing in Birmingham, Alabama, kills four children and injures 22.
September 19 – Iota Phi Theta fraternity is founded.
 September 24 – The U.S. Senate ratifies the nuclear test ban treaty.

October
 October 1 – The Presidential Commission on the Status of Women issues its final reports to President Kennedy.
 October 6 – The Los Angeles Dodgers defeat the New York Yankees, 4 games to 0, to win their third World Series title in baseball.
 October 8 – Sam Cooke and his band are arrested after trying to register at a "whites only" motel in Louisiana. In the months following, he records "A Change Is Gonna Come".
 October 22 – Chicago Public Schools Boycott.
 October 28 – Demolition of the 1910 Pennsylvania Station begins in New York City, continuing until 1966.
 October 31 – 1963 Indiana State Fairgrounds Coliseum gas explosion: 81 die in a gas explosion during a Holiday on Ice show at the Indiana State Fair Coliseum in Indianapolis.

November
 November 2–4 – 1963 Freedom Ballot, a mock election organized to protest and combat the systematic disenfranchisement of blacks in Mississippi. 
 November 10 – Malcolm X makes his "Message to the Grass Roots" speech in Detroit.
 November 16 – A newspaper strike begins in Toledo, Ohio.
 November 18 – The first push-button telephone is made available to AT&T customers in the United States.

 November 22 – John F. Kennedy assassination: In Dallas, President John F. Kennedy is shot to death, Texas Governor John B. Connally is seriously wounded, and Vice President Lyndon B. Johnson becomes the 36th President. All television coverage for the next three days is devoted to the assassination, its aftermath, the procession of the horsedrawn casket to the Capitol Rotunda, and the funeral of President Kennedy. Stores and businesses shut down for the entire weekend and Monday, in tribute.
 November 23 – The Golden Age Nursing Home fire kills 63 elderly people near Fitchville, Ohio.

 November 24 
Lee Harvey Oswald, assassin of John F. Kennedy, is shot dead by Jack Ruby in Dallas on live national television. Later that night, a hastily arranged program, A Tribute to John F. Kennedy from the Arts, featuring actors, opera singers, and noted writers, all performing dramatic readings and/or music, is telecast on ABC-TV.
Vietnam War: President Johnson confirms that the United States intends to continue supporting South Vietnam militarily and economically.
 November 25 – President Kennedy is buried at Arlington National Cemetery. Schools around the nation do not have class on that day, and millions around the world watch the funeral on live television.
 November 29 – President Johnson establishes the Warren Commission to investigate the assassination of President Kennedy.

December
 December 1 – Wendell Scott becomes the first African-American driver to win a NASCAR race at Speedway Park
 December 8 
Frank Sinatra Jr. is kidnapped at Harrah's Lake Tahoe.
A lightning strike causes the crash of Pan Am Flight 214 near Elkton, Maryland, killing 81 people.
 December 10 
The X-20 Dyna-Soar spaceplane program is cancelled. 
Chuck Yeager becomes the first pilot to make an emergency ejection in the full pressure suit needed for high altitude flights.
 December 14 – Baldwin Hills Dam disaster floods South Los Angeles, causing five deaths.
 December 25 – Walt Disney releases his 18th feature-length animated motion picture, The Sword in the Stone, about the boyhood of King Arthur. It is Disney's final animated film to be released during his lifetime, before his death in 1966.
 December 26 – The Beatles' songs "I Want to Hold Your Hand" and "I Saw Her Standing There" are released in the U.S., marking the beginning of full-scale Beatlemania.

Undated
 David. H. Frisch and James H. Smith prove that the radioactive decay of mesons is slowed by their motion (see Einstein's special relativity and general relativity).

Ongoing
 Cold War (1947–1991)
 Space Race (1957–75)

Births
 January 2
 David Cone, baseball player 
 Edgar Martínez, baseball player 
 January 3
 Rebecca Broussard, actress and model 
 New Jack, professional wrestler (d. 2021)
 January 6 – Eugene McDowell, basketball player (d. 1995) 
 January 7 – Rand Paul, U.S. Senator from Kentucky from 2011
 January 9 – Eric Erlandson, guitarist, songwriter and producer
 January 10 – Mark Pryor, U.S. Senator from Arkansas from 2003 to 2014
 January 13 – Tim Kelly, guitarist (d. 1998)  
 January 14 – Steven Soderbergh, film director
 January 15 – Bruce Schneier, cryptographer and author
 January 18 – Martin O'Malley, 61st Governor of Maryland and 47th Mayor of Baltimore
 January 20 – Firebreaker Chip, professional wrestler 
 January 25 – Don Mancini, screenwriter and film director 
 January 26 – Guy Lawson, writer and journalist 
 January 30 – Daphne Ashbrook, actress  
 January 31 – John Dye, actor (d. 2011)
 February 4 – Tracie Ruiz-Confroto, synchronized swimmer
 February 8
 Joshua Kadison, singer-songwriter  
 Gene Steratore, American football official  
 February 9 – Brian Greene, theoretical physicist
 February 11
 Dan Osman, extreme sport practitioner (d. 1998) 
 Diane Franklin, actress 
 February 12
 Brian Haley, actor and stand-up comedian 
 Brent Jones, American football player
 John Michael Higgins, actor and voice actor
 February 14 – John R. Dilworth, animator and producer 
 February 15 – Steven Michael Quezada, actor  
 February 17 
 Michael Jordan, basketball player
 Rene Syler, television journalist
 Larry the Cable Guy, stand-up comedian and actor
 February 19 – Jessica Tuck, actress 
 February 20 – Charles Barkley, basketball player
 February 21 – William Baldwin, actor, producer and writer
 February 22 – Don Wakamatsu, baseball player 
 February 23 – Bobby Bonilla, baseball player 
 February 25 – Joseph Edward Duncan, serial killer (d. 2021)
 February 26 – Chase Masterson, actress and singer 
 February 28 – Joey Marella, wrestling referee (d. 1994) 
 March 1
 Bryan Batt, actor 
 Russell Wong, actor 
 March 4 
 Jason Newsted, Metallica bassist from 1986 to 2001
 Daniel Roebuck, actor 
 March 5
 Joe Exotic, zoo owner and convicted felon 
 Joel Osteen, pastor and televangelist 
 March 6
 Kathy Kelly, musician 
 Gary Stevens, jockey
 March 8 – Jim Nelson, journalist and editor  
 March 10 – Rick Rubin, record producer
 March 11 – David LaChapelle, photographer 
 March 12 
 John Andretti, race car driver (d. 2020)  
 Christine Falling, serial killer of six children
 Candy Costie, synchronized swimmer
 March 13 – Michael Quercio, musician 
 March 14
 Mike Rochford, Major League Baseball pitcher  
 Andrew Fleming, film director 
 Mike Muir, singer and musician 
 March 15
 Bret Michaels, rock singer (Poison)
 Greg Nicotero, SFX Artist, television producer, and director 
 March 17 – Lise Simms, actress
 March 18 
 Jeff LaBar, rock guitarist (d. 2021)
 Vanessa Williams, African American model, singer, actress and fashion designer
 March 19 – Mary Scheer, American actress and comedian
 March 20
 Paul Annacone, tennis player and coach
 Kathy Ireland, model and actress
 March 21 – Shawn Lane, musician (d. 2003)
 March 22 – Diana Merriweather Ashby, cancer activist (d. 1997) 
 March 24 – John T. Chisholm, prosecutor; District Attorney of Milwaukee County, Wisconsin (2007–present) 
 March 25 – Robbie Fulks, alternative country singer-songwriter and instrumentalist 
 March 27 
 Dave Koz, jazz musician 
 Quentin Tarantino, filmmaker, screenwriter and actor
 April 4 – Jack Del Rio, American football player and coach  
 April 5 – Dawn Crosby, singer (d. 1996)  
 April 6 – Derrick May, electronic musician
 April 8 – Dean Norris, actor
 April 9
 Marc Jacobs, fashion designer
 Joe Scarborough, newscaster 
 April 10 – Warren DeMartini, rock guitarist  
 April 12
 Michael English, Christian musician
 Tracy Camilla Johns, actress 
 April 13 – Nick Vanos, basketball player (d. 1987)
 April 16 – Jimmy Osmond, American singer
 April 17 – Joel Murray, actor 
 April 19 – Valerie Plame, CIA Operations officer and novelist 
 April 21
 Ken Caminiti, baseball player (d. 2004) 
 Brian Goldner,  businessman and film producer (d. 2021)
 April 30 – Michael Waltrip, race car driver
 May 1 – Benjamin LaGuer, prisoner proclaiming innocence for more than two decades (d. 2020) 
 May 2 – Ray Traylor, professional wrestler ("Big Boss Man") (d. 2004)
 May 7 – Johnny Lee Middleton, bass player and songwriter 
 May 8
 John Altobelli, baseball coach (d. 2020) 
 Melissa Gilbert, actress and president of the Screen Actors Guild
 May 9 –  Ron Miles, musician and composer (d. 2022)
 May 12 – Jerry Trimble, actor and martial artist
 May 16 – Jon Coffelt, artist
 May 23 – Wally Dallenbach Jr., race car driver and announcer
 May 24
 Ken Flach, tennis player (d. 2018)
 Michael Chabon, author
 Joe Dumars, basketball player
 Rich Rodriguez, American football coach
 May 29
 Lisa Whelchel, actress, singer and writer 
 Tracey E. Bregman, actress and designer 
 Tom Burnett, passenger on board United Airlines Flight 93 (d. 2001) 
 May 30 – Shauna Grant, porn actress (d. 1984) 
 May 31 – Wesley Willis, outsider musician (d. 2003)  
 June 1 – David Rudman, puppeteer, puppet builder, writer, director and producer
 June 4 – Ira Valentine, American footballer (d. 2022)
 June 5 – Karl Sanders, singer-songwriter and guitarist 
 June 6
 Anthony Starke, actor 
 Eric Cantor, politician, lawyer, and banker 
 June 9 – Johnny Depp, actor, producer and musician
 June 12
 Tim DeKay, actor  
 Jerry Lynn, professional wrestler 
 June 13 – Greg Daniels, television comedy writer, producer, and director  
 June 16 
 The Sandman, professional wrestler
 Scott Alexander, screenwriter 
 June 18 – Bruce Smith, American football player 
 June 20
Amir Derakh, guitarist
Don West, sportscaster
 June 24 – Mike Wieringo,  comic-book artist (d. 2007) 
 June 25 – John Benjamin Hickey, actor
 June 27 – David Drake, playwright, stage director, actor and author  
 June 28 – Mike Fitzpatrick, lawyer and politician (d. 2020) 
 June 29 – Cathy Konrad, film and television producer 
 July 1 – Roddy Bottum, musician 
 July 4 – Michael Sweet, singer
 July 5 – Dorien Wilson, actor  
 July 6 – Todd Burns, baseball player
 July 7 – Lance Johnson, baseball player
 July 17 – Regina Belle, singer–songwriter and actress
 July 18 – 
 Sandy Fox, voice actress 
 Mike Greenwell, baseball player and race car driver
 Al Snow, professional wrestler  
 July 24 – Karl Malone, American professional basketball player  
 July 30
 Lisa Kudrow, actress
 Chris Mullin, basketball player, coach, and executive
 August 1 – Coolio, rapper, record producer, and actor (d. 2022)
 August 2 – Laura Bennett, fashion designer 
 August 3
 James Hetfield, Metallica vocalist and backing guitarist
 Lisa Ann Walter, actress and producer 
 August 6 – Gwendolyn Graham, serial killer
 August 7
 Ramon Estevez, actor  
 Harold Perrineau, actor
 August 9 – Whitney Houston, African American R&B vocalist, wife of Bobby Brown (d. 2012)
 August 11 – Stefon Adams, former NFL cornerback
 August 13 – Steve Higgins, writer, producer, announcer, actor and comedian 
 August 19 – John Stamos, actor
 August 22 – Tori Amos, singer-songwriter
 August 23 – Kenny Wallace, race car driver
 August 27 – Bobby Griffith, gay suicide victim (d. 1983)
 August 31 – Egyptian Lover, rapper, DJ and producer  
 September 9 – Chris Coons, U.S. Senator from Delaware from 2010
 September 10 – Randy Johnson, baseball player
 September 11 – Joey Dedio, actor 
 September 12 – Norberto Barba, cinematographer and film director 
 September 16
 Richard Marx, singer
 Leslie Wing, actress  
 September 17 
 Gian-Carlo Coppola, film producer (d. 1986)
 James Urbaniak, actor
 September 18 – Dan Povenmire, animator, voice actor, director, writer, producer and storyboard artist
 September 25 – Tate Donovan, actor and director
 September 26 – Joe Nemechek, stock car driver
 September 28
 Steve Blackman, professional wrestler 
 Susan Walters, actress and model 
 Elliot Levine, keyboardist (Heatwave) 
 September 29
 O'Landa Draper, gospel music artist (d. 1998) 
 Les Claypool, bassist (Primus)
 October 1
 Darvin Moon, self-employed logger and amateur poker player (d. 2020) 
 Mark McGwire, baseball player
 October 6 – Elisabeth Shue, actress
 October 10 – Daniel Pearl, journalist (d. 2002)
 October 12 – Lane Frost, bull rider (d. 1989) 
 October 14 – Lori Petty, actress, director and screenwriter
 October 22 – Brian Boitano, figure skater
 October 23 – Gordon Korman, American-Canadian author  
 October 25 – Tracy Nelson, actress, dancer and writer  
 October 26
 Ted Demme, director and producer (d. 2002) 
 Natalie Merchant, singer, songwriter and musician 
 October 31
 Michael Beach, actor 
 Fred McGriff, baseball player 
 Dermot Mulroney, actor
 Rob Schneider, actor, comedian and film director
 November 1 – Josh Wicks, soccer player
 November 6 
 Jonna Lee, actress & artist/sculptor
 Rozz Williams, singer (died 1998)
 November 10
 Tommy Davidson, comedian, film and television actor
 Mike McCarthy, American football coach
 Mike Powell, long jumper
 November 11 – Billy Gunn, professional wrestler
 November 13 – Vinny Testaverde, American football player
 November 18
 Len Bias, basketball player (died 1986)
 Dante Bichette, baseball player
 November 22
 Winsor Harmon, actor
 Brian Robbins, actor, director, producer and screenwriter
 November 25
 Chip Kelly, American football player and coach
 Bernie Kosar, American football player 
 Kevin Chamberlin, actor 
 November 27 – Dave Prichard, guitarist (died 1990)
 December 8 – Wendell Pierce, African American actor
 December 12 – Liz Claman, journalist
 December 15 – Lenny Young, film producer
 December 16 – Benjamin Bratt, actor, producer and activist
 December 18 – Brad Pitt, film actor and producer
 December 23
 Jim Harbaugh, American football player and coach
 Jess Harnell, voice actor and singer
 Donna Tartt, novelist

Deaths
 January 1 – Robert S. Kerr, businessman and politician (b. 1896)
 January 2 – Dick Powell, actor (b. 1904)
 January 5 – Rogers Hornsby, baseball player (St. Louis Cardinals) (b. 1896)
 January 6
 Frank Tuttle, film director (b. 1892)
 Stark Young, teacher, playwright, novelist, painter, literary critic and essayist (b. 1881)
 January 8
 Boris Morros, film producer and FBI double agent (b. 1891)
 Jack Okey, art director (b. 1889)
 Kay Sage, poet (b. 1898)
 January 9 – Enea Bossi Sr., aerospace engineer and aviation pioneer (b. 1888 in Italy)
 January 22 – Richard Spikes, inventor (b. 1878)
 January 29 – Robert Frost, poet (b. 1874)
 March 4 – William Carlos Williams, poet (b. 1883)
 March 5 – plane crash
 Patsy Cline, country music singer (b. 1932)
 Cowboy Copas, country music singer (b. 1913)
 Hawkshaw Hawkins, country music singer (b. 1921)
 April 3 – Alma Richards, high jumper (b. 1890)
 May 2 – Van Wyck Brooks, literary critic and writer (b. 1886)
 May 6 – Monty Woolley, character actor (b. 1888)
 May 11 – Herbert Spencer Gasser, physiologist, Nobel Prize in Physiology or Medicine laureate (b. 1888)
 May 18 – Ernie Davis, American football player, first African American to win the Heisman Trophy (b. 1939)
 May 19 – Walter Russell, polymath (b. 1871)
 May 24 – Elmore James, African American blues guitarist (b. 1918)
 June 7 – ZaSu Pitts, film actress (b. 1894)
 June 10 – Anita King, actress and race-car driver (b. 1884)
 June 12 – Medgar Evers, field secretary for the National Association for the Advancement of Colored People, assassinated in Mississippi due to civil rights activity (b. 1925)
 July 2 – Alicia Patterson, newspaper editor (b. 1906)
 July 18 – Jack Solomon, restaurateur (b. 1896)
 August 1 – Theodore Roethke, poet (b. 1908)
 August 2 – Oliver La Farge, fiction writer and anthropologist (b. 1901)
 August 4 – Tom Keene, Western film actor (b. 1896)
 August 9 – Patrick Bouvier Kennedy, son of President and Mrs. Kennedy (b. August 7)
 August 10 – Estes Kefauver, politician (b. 1903)
 August 11 – Clem Bevans, character actor (b. 1879)
 August 14 – Clifford Odets, playwright (b. 1906)
 August 27 – W. E. B. Du Bois, leading African American sociologist, historian and co-founder of the National Association for the Advancement of Colored People (b. 1868)
 September 11 – Claude Fuess, 10th Headmaster of Phillips Academy, Andover, Massachusetts (b. 1885)
 October 4 
 Lloyd Fredendall, U.S. Army general (b. 1883)
 Kate Gordon Moore, psychologist (b. 1878)
 October 11 – John W. Nordstrom, Swedish-born American co-founder of the Nordstrom department store chain (d. 1963)
 October 20 – Everett Warner, impressionist painter and printmaker (b. 1877)
 October 24 – Douglas Croft, actor (b. 1926)
 November 5 – Vernon Dent, American actor and comedian, main antagonist of the Three Stooges (b. 1895)
 November 22
 Aldous Huxley, writer (b. 1894 in the United Kingdom)
 John F. Kennedy, 35th President of the United States from 1961 to 1963 (b. 1917)
 J. D. Tippit, Dallas police officer (b. 1924)
 November 24 – Lee Harvey Oswald, sniper, assassinated John F. Kennedy (b. 1939)
 November 26 – Amelita Galli-Curci, Italian-born operatic soprano (b, 1882 in Italy)
 December 14 – Dinah Washington, African American blues singer (b. 1924)
 December 26 – Gorgeous George, professional wrestler (b. 1915)
 December 28
 A. J. Liebling, journalist (b. 1904)
 Joseph Magliocco, mobster (b. 1898)

See also
 List of American films of 1963
 Timeline of United States history (1950–1969)

References

External links
 
 

 
1960s in the United States
United States
United States
Years of the 20th century in the United States